Ram Nagar railway station is a small railway station in Udhampur district, Jammu and Kashmir. Its code is RMJK. It serves Ramnagar town. The station consists of two platforms. The platforms are not well sheltered. It lacks many facilities including water and sanitation.

References

External links

Railway stations in Udhampur district
Firozpur railway division